R v Buhay [2003] 1 S.C.R. 631,  is a leading Supreme Court of Canada decision on the Charter rights protecting against unreasonable search and seizure (section 8) and the criteria for the exclusion of evidence under section 24(2). The court held that for evidence to be excluded on the Collins test, the seriousness of the breach must be determined by looking at factors such as good faith and necessity. On the facts, marijuana found in a bus station locker was excluded from evidence because the police had insufficient reason to search it without a warrant.

Background
Mr. Buhay had rented a locker in a Winnipeg bus station in which he stored a duffel bag of marijuana. The smell from the bag attracted the attention of the security guards who had a station attendant open it for them. They confirmed their suspicion of the contents of the bag, then locked it back into the locker, and called the police. When the police arrived they had the attendant open the locker again. They took the bag.

At no time did anyone get a warrant to search the locker. The police officers had testified that it did not cross their mind as they didn't think a locker had any right to privacy, moreover they were doubtful there would be enough grounds for a warrant.

At trial, the judge found that the police violated section 8 of the Charter and excluded the evidence under section 24(2). The Court of Appeal overturned the acquittal on the basis that the locker was under the control of the stations security and there was no unlawful search.

The Supreme Court restored the trial judge's acquittal, finding that there was a violation of section 8 and the grounds were sufficient to exclude the evidence.

Opinion of the Court
The majority was written by Arbour J.

External links

Section Eight Charter case law
Supreme Court of Canada cases
2003 in Canadian case law